Forty-seven species of snake have been recorded in Trinidad and Tobago, making the snake population of this area the most diverse in the Caribbean. Forty-four of these snake species are found in Trinidad and twenty-one in Tobago. Many of these species are South American, most of which are present in Venezuela. Trinidad and Tobago consists of two main islands, Trinidad and Tobago, and several smaller islands.  The Bocas Islands, which lie between Trinidad and Venezuela, in the Bocas del Dragón (Dragon's Mouths), consist of Chacachacare, Monos, Huevos and Gaspar Grande.  Several smaller islands lie off Trinidad, but snakes have been recorded on only one of them, Caledonia Island.  Snakes have been recorded on one island off Tobago, Little Tobago. Four species are venomous: two coral snake species (Micrurus spp.), the fer-de-lance (Bothrops atrox) and the South American bushmaster (Lachesis muta). The common coral (Micrurus fulvius) is found on at least two of the Bocas Islands: Gaspar Grande and Monos.  No venomous snakes inhabit Tobago.Anomalepididae
Anomalepididae is a family of nonvenomous snakes native to Central and South America. They are similar to Typhlopidae, except that some species possess a single tooth in the lower jaw. One possible species has been recorded in Trinidad and Tobago.

Leptotyphlopidae
Leptotyphlopidae is a family of snakes found in North and South America, Africa, and Asia. All are fossorial and adapted to burrowing, feeding on ants and termites. One species has been recorded in Trinidad and Tobago.

Typhlopidae
Typhlopidae is a family of blind snakes found mostly in the tropical regions of Africa, Asia and the Americas. Two species have been recorded in Trinidad and Tobago.

Aniliidae
Aniliidae is a monotypic family created for the monotypic genus Anilius, which means that there is only one species in the entire family. This species is A. scytale, found in South America.

Boidae
Boidae is a family of non-venomous snakes found in America, Africa, Europe, Asia and some Pacific Islands, containing the boas.  Four species have been recorded in Trinidad and Tobago.

Family Colubridae
Colubridae is a family of snakes comprising about two thirds of all snake species on earth. Colubrid species are found on every continent, except Antarctica.  Species from three subfamilies are found in Trinidad and Tobago.

Subfamily Xenodontinae
Xenodontinae is a subfamily of snakes within the family Colubridae that includes mud snakes and New World hognose snakes.

Subfamily Dipsadinae
Dipsadinae is a subfamily of snakes within the family Colubridae that includes cat-eyed snakes, night snakes, and black-striped snakes.

Subfamily Colubrinae
Colubrinae is the largest subfamily of colubrids, and includes rat snakes, king snakes, milk snakes, vine snakes and indigo snakes.

Family Elapidae
Elapidae is a family of venomous snakes found in tropical and subtropical regions around the world, including the Indian Ocean and the Pacific. Two species are found in Trinidad and Tobago.

Family Viperidae
Viperidae is a family of venomous snakes found all over the world, except for Australia, New Zealand, Ireland, Madagascar, Hawaii and the Arctic Circle. All have relatively long hinged fangs that permit deep penetration and injection of venom. Two species are found in Trinidad and Tobago.

See also
 Environment of Trinidad and Tobago
 List of birds of Trinidad and Tobago
 List of butterflies of Trinidad and Tobago

Notes

References
All information is based on Boos (2001) unless otherwise stated.

Bibliography

External links
 Medicinal and ethnoveterinary remedies of hunters in Trinidad from BMC Complementary and Alternative Medicine (BioMed Central).

 Snakes
Snakes
Trinidad and Tobago
.Trinidad and Tobago